Trash Tycoon was an upcycling social network game developed by Guerillapps in 2011. The game applies traditional social gameplay features with the issues of waste, water, and green. Gameplay includes cleaning a town overrun by trash, recycling, and constructing products and decorations out of recycled material. The game shares a number of partnerships with real world companies, including TerraCycle, Carbonfund.org, TreeHugger, and Kraft Foods. Trash Tycoon has been shut down on July 29, 2012.

Gameplay
In Trash Tycoon, players collect litter in a city covered in trash and upcycle waste into valuable, environmentally friendly products. You can create other items such as jewelry, toys and furniture, which you can either keep for yourself or sell for profit. The game's production processes reflect the aims of sponsor and partner TerraCycle, a company that provides solution programs for waste that is typically non-recyclable. The 21 million people who participate in TerraCycle’s recycling programs and Trash Tycoon earn points for every piece of waste they collect and return to a TerraCycle kiosk. These points convert to special bonuses including in-game money, special decorative items, or exclusive badges that allow users to show in-game friends their Greenness habits outside of the game.

Multiplayer
Trash Tycoon allows players to team up with neighbors in a multiplayer environment to collaborate in real-time and clean up the virtual city. The game also contains a real time chat feature. Additionally, neighbors can help players regain energy and speed up production.

References

Browser games
2011 video games